Sandkings may refer to:

Sandkings (short story collection), a short story collection by George R. R. Martin
Sandkings (novelette), a novelette by George R. R. Martin
"The Sandkings", an episode of The Outer Limits based on the novelette of the same name
The Sandkings (band), an independent British rock band